George Waltham Bell was an American doctor who served in the Arkansas Senate from 1891 to 1895. He was a graduate of Lincoln University in Pennsylvania. He served as president of Southland College.

Bell was elected to the Arkansas Senate and served representing the 15th District (Desha and Chicot County, Arkansas Chicot counties) in the 28th Arkansas General Assembly and the 29th Arkansas General Assembly. While in office, he opposed separate coach laws. J. H. Smith wrote a letter disputing Bell's descriptions of his speech in 1891.

See also
African-American officeholders during and following the Reconstruction era

References

Year of birth missing
Year of death missing
Lincoln University (Pennsylvania) alumni
Arkansas state senators
19th-century American physicians
African-American physicians
African-American state legislators in Arkansas
African-American academics
Physicians from Arkansas